Martin Xavier "Marty" Casey (born September 26, 1973)
is an American rock musician who is the lead singer, primary songwriter and second guitarist of the band Lovehammers.
After years of building a strong local following in Chicago, Illinois and the Midwest, Casey achieved international fame on the first season of the reality show Rock Star: INXS. Casey made it to the final two of the competition, finishing as the runner-up to winner J.D. Fortune. Although he was not chosen as the new singer for INXS, he was invited to tour as opening act.  In 2006, Marty Casey and the Lovehammers opened on the first leg of the INXS Switched On Tour. Marty was a fan favorite on Rock Star: INXS, receiving the most viewer votes,
and topping the download charts with his performances of both covers and original material.

Biography

Early life

The youngest of six children
 Born to Marilyn and John Casey, Marty Casey was born in the Chicago suburb of Hickory Hills, Illinois.  As a child and youth, Casey was an avid sportsman, competing in both baseball and wrestling. When he was eight years old he met future Swinging Lovehammers bandmates Bobby and Dino Kourelis while playing together on a local T-Ball team. Casey and the Kourelis brothers formed Lovehammers (initially named The Swinging Lovehammers) in 1988. During this time Casey attended Amos Alonzo Stagg High School in Palos Hills, Illinois. After receiving a degree in Finance at the University of Illinois at Urbana–Champaign, he worked part-time as a real estate appraiser while continuing to record and tour with his band. He was a member of Star Course, a student run organization at the University of Illinois. He was also a member of Delta Sigma Phi fraternity.

While touring with artists including Nickelback, Jerry Cantrell, Interpol, New Found Glory, and Cake, Casey and the Lovehammers began to build a small but loyal national following.

His musical influences include: Guns N' Roses, AC/DC, Cyndi Lauper, Rob Bass, Joe Cocker, and Accept.

A number of the band's songs have been included in television shows and movies. The group's DVD, "Live/Raw" charted well on the Billboard musical DVD charts in 2004. Casey was a finalist in the annual John Lennon Songwriting Contest, with his song "Rain on the Brain," featured on the L'Strange album.

Rock Star: INXS
During the competition, Casey gained the respect of the INXS band members as well as viewers.  His performances consistently received high marks, and he received the most votes of any contestant on the show.  Near the end of the competition, he performed his original song "Trees", which became a fan favorite.  "Trees" was picked up by mainstream radio.

Casey's extended family and long-term fans (known as Hammerheads) were very supportive of his run on the show, co-hosting viewing parties for the fans at Chicago bars, and even organizing shuttle buses to bring fans to the parties.  Casey spoke frequently of being "humbled" and "honored" by all the support he received.

On his Rock Star: INXS blog, Casey wrote: "I love writing music and I think performing those creations completes the cycle and helps me define my life. Writing music is the thought and performing is the action. Great thoughts must be put into action in order to exist. Action without thought can be a train wreck."

Post Rock Star: INXS
After revealing J.D. Fortune as the winner and new INXS front man, INXS guitarist Tim Farriss offered Casey the job of opening act on INXS's upcoming tour, which Casey accepted. During the tour, Casey and his band released their major label debut, Marty Casey and Lovehammers (released 24 January 2006, through Epic Records).  The album could be described as a "best-of" compilation of songs from previous indie albums, though songs were chosen largely on the basis of accessibility as well as to showcase the band to a more mainstream audience.  Though some songs were re-recorded and remixed for the recording, the album featured only one completely new track.  There was some criticism that the album was sold under "Marty Casey and Lovehammers" as opposed to their current bandname - "Swinging Lovehammers" - however, fans generally understood that the album's purpose was to capitalize on Marty's TV exposure and to increase their fan base.

Casey continues to tour with Lovehammers, now as headliners.  As natives of Chicago's South Side, they are avid fans of the Chicago White Sox, and were particularly excited to be asked to play before some games in October 2005 and 2006.

In 2008 he joined Tracii Guns' version of LA Guns.  He both co-wrote and provided vocals, touring with the L.A. Guns through 2009.  In a 2009 interview, Tracii stated that L.A. Guns parted ways with Alexus Records and that he was unsure whether the material recorded with Marty Casey or the VH1 pilot would ever be released.

Casey returned to the Lovehammers in 2009 in order to record and release the album Heavy Crown.

In January 2009, Casey conducted a two-week solo acoustic tour of New Zealand, in support of charity CanTeen, which supports young people living with cancer. The tour was run by Christchurch resident Tania Gilchrist.  One New Zealand radio interview took place in Invercargill on January, 12th 2009, airing on 89.2 MORE FM's The Morning Fix with Andy George Andy George.  It can be viewed here.

Silver Elements Collection
In 2008, following his success on Rockstar: INXS, Casey and fashion industry veteran, Marla Zegart, founded the Silver Elements collection.  This collection features silver jewelry and accessories.  Zegart is a fan of Casey and, on a whim, approached him after a show and "told him he had a great sense of style, and asked him if he would think of doing something together." She says of Casey: "You know, there are a lot of celebrities who just attach their name to something but Marty is co-designer on this. It's not just his name. He's an integral part of the design process, the ideas; he's very involved; he's part of every single piece."  All purchases support the "Marty Casey Elements of Nature Fund," which plants trees in conjunction with American Forests "Global Releaf" Ecosystem Restoration Project.  The founding piece is the Trees Dog Tag necklace, named for the original song he first performed live on Rockstar: INXS.  The collection has expanded to include not only jewelry and watches, but high end accessories such as leather bags, sunglasses, scarves, and even a photo frame.
Marty describes the Silver Elements Collection:

Discography

With Lovehammers
 Ultrasound (1997) [As Swinging Lovehammers]
 Demolition EP (1999)
 L'Strange (2000)
 How We Live EP (2001)
 Murder On My Mind (2003)
 Trees EP (2006) [As Marty Casey and Lovehammers]
 Marty Casey and Lovehammers (2006)
 Merry Christmas (All Year Long) EP (2006) [As Marty Casey and Lovehammers]
 Heavy Crown (2009)
 Guns EP (2010)
 Set Fire (2012)
 Into the Insane EP (2013)
 Price I Pay EP (2014)
 Ground you walk on (2017)

DVD Releases
 Live/Raw (2004) (With Lovehammers)
 Rock Star: INXS / The DVD (2005)
 And the Rest is History... (2006) (With Lovehammers)

Music Videos
 Merry Christmas (All Year Long) (2006) (View here)
 Sleeper (2008) by Stock Yard Film (View here)
 Price I Pay (2013) (View here)

See also
 Lovehammers
 INXS
 Rockstar: INXS
 LA Guns

Notes

References
 "New sensation: Marty Casey is a hit!", Karen Budell, Metromix Chicago Bars & Clubs, October 2005.

External links
 Official site of Marty Casey, Singer and Songwriter
 Lovehammers
 Lovehammers Fan Club
 Marty Casey bio at ROCKBANDLOUNGE.COM
 Lovehammers YouTube Channel
 Marty Casey on Facebook
 Lovehammers on Facebook
 Marty Casey on Twitter
 Lovehammers on Twitter
 Free Lovehammers eCards
 Interview with Marty Casey at WickedInfo.com
 "New sensation: Marty Casey is a hit!", Metromix Chicago Bars & Clubs.
 Marty Casey on the Sunset Strip

Living people
1973 births
American rock singers
Singers from Chicago
Participants in American reality television series
Gies College of Business alumni
People from Cook County, Illinois
21st-century American singers
21st-century American male singers